Serpentine (foaled 20 March 2017) is an Irish Thoroughbred racehorse best known for his win in the 2020 Epsom Derby.

Background
Serpentine is a chestnut gelding with a white blaze and a white sock on his left hind leg bred in Ireland by the Coolmore Stud. He is owned by the Coolmore partners Michael Tabor, Susan Magnier and Derrick Smith. Like many Coolmore horses he was sent into training with Aidan O'Brien at Ballydoyle. After his four-year-old season racing he was gelded

He was sired by Galileo, who won the Derby, Irish Derby and King George VI and Queen Elizabeth Stakes in 2001. Galileo became one of the world's leading stallions, earning his tenth champion sire of Great Britain and Ireland title in 2018. His other progeny include: Frankel, Nathaniel, New Approach, Rip Van Winkle, Found Minding, Love and Ruler of the World. Serpentine's dam Remember When failed to win in six races but was a top-class filly who ran second in the 2010 Epsom Oaks, She was a daughter of the outstanding broodmare Lagrion, making her a half-sister to Dylan Thomas, Homecoming Queen and Queen's Logic.

Racing career

2019: two-year-old season
On his only appearance as a two-year-old Serpentine started the 10/1 sixth choice in the betting for a maiden race over eight and a half furlongs on soft ground at Galway Racecourse on 17 September. Ridden by Wayne Lordan he was always racing towards the rear and came home tenth of the eleven runners behind his stablemate Persia, beaten sixteen lengths by the winner.

2020: three-year-old season
The 2020 flat racing season in England and Ireland was disrupted by the COVID-19 Pandemic and Serpentine did not make his reappearance until 12 June when he contested a maiden over ten furlongs at the Curragh. With Seamie Heffernan in the saddle he started the 100/30 favourite but finished fifth of the eighteen runners behind Galileo Chrome after appearing to be outpaced in the closing stages. Lordan took the ride fifteen days later when the colt started 5/2 favourite for a maiden over the same course and distance. He led from the start, went well clear of his seven opponents at half distance and increased his advantage in the final furlong to win "easily" by nine lengths from Monument Valley.

The 241st running of the Epsom Derby took place a month later than usual, behind closed doors, over one and a half miles at Epsom Racecourse on 4 July. The race was run on good ground in wet, overcast conditions and attracted a field of seventeen runners. Serpentine, ridden by Emmet McNamara, was one of the less fancied of the six horse entry from the O'Brien stable and went off at odds of 25/1 in a field which included: Kameko, English King (winner of the Lingfield Derby Trial), Mogul (Juvenile Stakes), Pyledriver (King Edward VII Stakes), Vatican City (2nd in Irish 2,000 Guineas), Russian Emperor (Hampton Court Stakes), Khalifa Sat (Cocked Hat Stakes), Max Vega (Zetland Stakes) and Mohican Heights (Stonehenge Stakes). Serpentine led from the start, opened up a decisive advantage, accelerated five furlongs out and entered the straight some twelve lengths clear of his rivals. Although his lead steadily diminished in the last quarter mile he never looked to be in any danger of defeat and won by five and a half lengths from Khalifa Sat with Amhran Na Bhfiann taking third place just ahead of Kameko and English King. McNamara, who had not ridden a winner in nine months, commented "I think I got a little bit of a freebie. All I could hear was the horse breathing. He was in a good rhythm, he was relaxed and I couldn't hear a thing around me... I'm not the lightest guy in the world, but thankfully, Aidan knows I'm riding out every day and I'm fit as a fiddle, so when a race like this pops up and he's got a few extra runners, he seems to give me a couple of spins".

After a break of over two months Serpentine returned to the track for the 2400 metres Grand Prix de Paris which was run that year at Longchamp Racecourse on 13 September. Ridden by Christophe Soumillon he started second favourite but after being in contention from the start he was unable to make any significant progress in the closing stages and came home fourth behind his stablemate Mogul. The colt was scheduled to run in the Prix de l'Arc de Triomphe over the same course and distance on 4 October but the O'Brien contingent was withdrawn en masse when four horses failed drug tests, with the results being attributed to a batch of contaminated feed.

At Ascot Racecourse on 17 October Serpentine was ridden by William Buick when he was dropped back in trip and started an 18/1 outsider for the Champion Stakes over ten furlongs. He led for most of the way before being overtaken in the straight and coming home fourth behind Addeybb, Skalleti and Magical.

In the 2020 World's Best Racehorse Rankings, Serpentine was rated on 120, making him the equal 40th best racehorse in the world.

Pedigree

References

External links
 Career 1-2-3 Colour Chart – Serpentine

2017 racehorse births
Racehorses bred in Ireland
Racehorses trained in Ireland
Thoroughbred family 9-c
Epsom Derby winners